Mickey Gibbs (born March 15, 1958) is an American professional stock car racing driver from Alabama. Gibbs won races in the ALL PRO Super Series, NASCAR All-American Challenge Series, American Speed Association, and ARCA ranks, along with the 1983 Snowball Derby before reaching the pinnacle of stock car racing, then known as the NASCAR Winston Cup Series. He is not related to highly successful NASCAR team owner Joe Gibbs.

Climbing the Ladder 
After making a lone start in the first race of the newly-revamped Budweiser Late Model Sportsman Series, Gibbs was a regular in the ALL PRO Super Series in the early years of the series. He scored his first win in 1983 at the famed Birmingham International Raceway, roughly an hour's drive from his hometown of Glencoe. He ranked 8th in the championship. He also held off former Winston Cup race winner and fellow All PRO regular Jody Ridley to win that December's Snowball Derby; a race that also featured Bobby Allison, Rusty Wallace, and Gary Balough among other contemporary and future stars.

In 1985 Gibbs moved to the All-American Challenge Series. He would win 5 races and place 4th in the points, behind Stanley Smith, Ronnie Sanders, and champion Dave Mader III. He would score another win in 1986, while not running all the races. Gibbs had a strong 1987 ALL PRO Series campaign. he won 6 races, including 2 more at BIR (one of which also counted towards the ASA championship), but was not as consistent as champion Jody Ridley or 2nd place Steve Grissom. Gibbs was 3rd on the season.

1988 saw Gibbs in a brighter spotlight after finding success in the ARCA Permatex SuperCar Series. Holding off wiley veteran racers Red Farmer and Charlie Glotzbach, Gibbs won the ARCA 200 at Daytona. He made 5 Winston Cup starts that year before winning the ARCA season finale at Atlanta, with a dominant performance that saw him defeat newly-crowned Busch Grand National champion Tommy Ellis and new ARCA champ Tracy Leslie.

Winston Cup Career 
After winning the ARCA 200 at Daytona, Gibbs failed to qualify for the Daytona 500. His first Winston Cup start came at Rockingham, driving for his father Don Gibbs. He started 25th, but was relegated to 35th because of an engine failure just before halfway in the Goodwrench 500. He would miss the field again at Atlanta, but led briefly under caution at Talladega (less than an hour from Glencoe). His only finish among his 5 starts was at Michigan, where he came home 31st.

Gibbs began the 1989 season driving for Winkle Motorsports. After missing the Daytona 500 again, he took the green flag in Buddy Arrington's car. Though he finished 20th at Rockingham for Winkle, he sat a disappointing 31st in points after Atlanta and was released from the team. In 7 starts that year, he also raced for Dingman Brothers Racing and his father's team. The father-son duo's 1990 season began by missing Daytona, but that was followed by respectable finishes of 19th at Richmond and 15th at Rockingham. In an abbreviated season, Gibbs attempted 12 races and started 9.

1991 appeared to provide the break Gibbs needed. He signed with Sam McMahon's Team III Racing for the full season, with championship-winning crew chief Barry Dodson. 17th at Daytona yielded the biggest payday of his career (nearly $25,000). Gibbs also came home 19th at Talladega, and a career-best 14th at Sears Point and Michigan. Though he sat a respectable 25th in points after the Pepsi 400 at Daytona, the unsponsored team replaced him with Dick Trickle and others to complete the season. Gibbs would not return to the Winston Cup Series.

Final Races and Summary 
Gibbs last known racing exploits came in a return to ARCA, driving for Bobby Jones in 1992. He demonstrated he still had the ability to win, leading 121 of 156 laps in a victory at Texas World Speedway. His last start came at Atlanta, but ended in a crash after halfway.

Gibbs competed in 36 Winston Cup races between 1988 and 1991, and one Budweiser Late Model Sportsman Series race. His success in the lower ranks included 6 wins in the All-American Challenge Series, 7 ALL PRO Series wins (one of which doubled as an ASA win), 3 ARCA wins (including the 1988 Daytona 200), and the 1983 Snowball Derby.

Motorsports career results

NASCAR
(key) (Bold – Pole position awarded by qualifying time. Italics – Pole position earned by points standings or practice time. * – Most laps led.)

Winston Cup Series

References

External links
 

1958 births
Living people
American Speed Association drivers
ARCA Menards Series drivers
NASCAR drivers
Racing drivers from Alabama